José Fernando Marqués Martínez (born 4 December 1984) is a Spanish professional footballer who plays as a midfielder.

Club career
Born in Madrid, Marqués first appeared professionally for hometown's Rayo Vallecano, playing ten games in La Liga then 25 in Segunda División. In the 2004–05 season he signed with Racing de Santander, but several bouts of indiscipline made him fall out of favour with the management, and he joined Atlético Madrid on loan in the January transfer window; he spent his first months with the capital side's B-team.

Eventually Marqués failed to settle with both clubs, with which he still had another spell. After less than one month with CD Castellón he joined Greek team Iraklis Thessaloniki FC, remaining in the country until the end of his contract on 16 June 2009.

On 26 June 2009, Marqués was linked with a move to Celtic. Following the initial link with the player the Scottish Premier League club offered him a trial on 14 July, and the player's agent, Manuel Ferrer, was quoted: "Celtic have made a proposal for Fernando to go on trial for a few days. However, this is unsure." He continued: "It's normal in the UK for players to go on trial. In Spain and Europe they do not do this kind of thing. So we are speaking and I hope he will accept"; eventually, nothing came of it.

During the month of August, Marqués went on a week-long trial with RCD Espanyol. On the 25th, after convincing manager Mauricio Pochettino, he secured a contract for the 2009–10 campaign. He scored his first and only goal for the Catalans on 10 January 2010, coming on as a second-half substitute in a 2–1 home win against Real Zaragoza.

Marques was signed by Parma F.C. on 14 July 2010 on loan from Terrassa FC, for €200,000, but injury disrupted his first year at the club and he did not take to the pitch once in the second half of the Serie A season. Nevertheless, the former signed him outright.

Marqués was released in the summer of 2012, but he appealed to the Italian Football Federation as he did not agree to the early termination. The governing body restored the contract, but Parma appealed to both the Italian Federation's Federal Court of Justice and the Tribunale Nazionale di Arbitrato per lo Sport (TNAS) of the Italian National Olympic Committee. The club later withdrew its appeal to the latter, after the contract was finally terminated by mutual consent.

References

External links

El Mundo stats 

1984 births
Living people
Footballers from Madrid
Spanish footballers
Association football midfielders
La Liga players
Segunda División players
Segunda División B players
Rayo Vallecano B players
Rayo Vallecano players
Racing de Santander players
Atlético Madrid B players
Atlético Madrid footballers
CD Castellón footballers
RCD Espanyol footballers
Terrassa FC footballers
CD Guadalajara (Spain) footballers
Super League Greece players
Iraklis Thessaloniki F.C. players
Serie A players
Parma Calcio 1913 players
Spain youth international footballers
Spanish expatriate footballers
Expatriate footballers in Greece
Expatriate footballers in Italy
Spanish expatriate sportspeople in Greece
Spanish expatriate sportspeople in Italy